The Great Divide is the debut album by the progressive metal group Ice Age, released in 1999.

Track listing

Personnel
 Jimmy Pappas – guitars, bass on tracks 1 and 4
 Arron DiCesare – bass
 Josh Pincus – vocals and keyboards
 Hal Aponte – drums and percussion

Notes
The only voice heard (not counting the chicken sound effects) on the instrumental Spare Chicken Parts is a clip from 2001: A Space Odyssey of astronaut Dave Bowman saying "Open the pod bay doors, please, Hal."

1999 debut albums
Magna Carta Records albums